Iodane generally refers to any organic derivative of iodine. Without modifier, iodane is the systematic name for the parent hydride of iodine, HI. Thus, any organoiodine compound with general formula RI (e.g., iodomethane , or iodobenzene ) is a substituted iodane. However, as used in the context of organic synthesis, the term iodane more specifically refers to organoiodine compounds with nonstandard bond order of bonds between iodine and other atoms, i.e., bond order of iodine greater than 1, making this term a synonym for hypervalent iodine. These iodine compounds are hypervalent because the iodine atom formally contains more than the 8 electrons in the valence shell required for the octet rule. When iodine is ligated to an organic residue and electronegative ligands (e.g. halides or carboxylates), hypervalent iodine occurs in a +3 oxidation state as iodine(III) or λ3-iodane, or in a +5 oxidation state as iodine(V) or λ5-iodane, or in a +7 oxidation state as iodine(VII) or λ7-iodane. Here, lambda convention is used to give the nonstandard bond order.

Using neutral electron counting, iodine itself contains 7 valence electrons. In a monovalent iodane such as iodobenzene, the ligand donates one additional electron to give a completed octet. In a λ3-iodane, three electrons are donated by the X-type ligands, making it a decet structure. Similarly, λ5-iodanes are dodecet molecules, and λ7-iodanes are tetradecet molecules. As with other hypervalent compounds, N-X-L notation can be used to describe the formal electron count of iodanes, in which N stands for the number of electrons around the central atom X (in this case iodine), and L is the total number of ligand bonds with X. Thus, λ3-iodanes can be described as 10-I-3 compounds, λ5-iodanes as 12-I-5 compounds, and λ7-iodanes as 14-I-7 compounds. As with other hypervalent compounds, these bonding in iodanes were formerly described using d-orbital participation, but 3-center-4-electron bonding is now believed to be the primary bonding mode.

In terms of chemical behavior, λ3-, λ5- and λ7-iodanes are generally oxidizing and/or electrophilic species. λ3- and λ5-iodanes have been widely applied as oxidants and as reagents for electrophilic functionalization in organic synthesis.

Iodane compounds
The concept of hypervalent iodine was developed by J.J. Musher in 1969. In order to accommodate the excess of electrons in hypervalent compounds the 3-center-4-electron bond was introduced in analogy with the 3-center-2-electron bond observed in electron deficient compounds. One such bond exists in iodine(III) compounds, two such bonds reside in iodine(V) compounds and three such bonds reside in iodine(VII) compounds. As a formalism, oxidation state assignments in iodane chemistry follow the convention that carbon is considered more electronegative than iodine, even though the Pauling electronegativities of carbon and iodine are 2.54 and 2.66, respectively. Under this convention, iodobenzene  is an iodine(I) compound, (dichloroiodo)benzene  and iodosobenzene or iodosylbenzene , are iodine(III) compounds, iodoxybenzene or iodylbenzene,  is an iodine(V) compound.

The first hypervalent iodine compound, (dichloroiodo)benzene was prepared in 1886 by the German chemist Conrad Willgerodt by passing chlorine gas through iodobenzene in a cooled solution of chloroform.

The λ3-iodanes such as diarylchloroiodanes have a pseudotrigonal bipyramidal geometry displaying apicophilicity with a phenyl group and a chlorine group at the apical positions and other phenyl group with two lone pair electrons in the equatorial positions. The λ5-iodanes such as the Dess-Martin periodinane have square pyramidal geometries with 4 heteroatoms in basal positions and one apical phenyl group.

(Diacetoxyiodo)benzene, phenyliodine diacetate, iodosobenzene diacetate, or PIDA is an organic reagent used as an oxidizing agent. It is a versatile reagent that can be used for cleaving glycols and α-hydroxy ketones and a variety of other reactions. Classical organic procedures exist for the preparation of (diacetoxyiodo)benzene from peracetic acid and acetic acid, which was also first prepared by Willgerodt.

[Bis(trifluoroacetoxy)iodo]benzene, phenyliodine bis(trifluoroacetate), or PIFA, is a related compound with stronger oxidizing power.

(Diacetoxyiodo)benzene can be hydrolysed and disportionationated by hot water to give iodoxybenzene or iodylbenzene .

This compound was first prepared by Willgerodt by disproportionation of iodosylbenzene under steam distillation to iodylbenzene and iodobenzene:

At lower temperatures in the presence of NaOH, (diacetoxyiodo)benzene can also be hydrolyzed to iodosylbenzene which is actually a polymer with the molecular formula . Iodosylbenzene is used in organic oxidations. Dess-Martin periodinane (1983) is another powerful oxidant and an improvement of the IBX acid already in existence in 1983. The IBX acid is prepared from 2-iodobenzoic acid and potassium bromate and sulfuric acid and is insoluble in most solvents whereas the Dess-Martin reagent prepared from reaction of the IBX acid with acetic anhydride is very soluble. The oxidation mechanism ordinarily consists of a ligand exchange reaction followed by a reductive elimination.

The synthesis of organyl periodyl derivatives (λ7-iodanes) has been attempted since the early 20th century, but efforts have so far met with failure, although the aryl derivatives of λ7-chloranes are known compounds. Organic diesters of iodine(VII) are presumed intermediates in the periodate cleavage of diols (Malaprade reaction), although no carbon-iodine(VII) bond is present in this process.

Diaryliodonium salts
Diaryliodonium salts are compounds of the type . They are formally composed of a diaryliodonium cation paired with a halide or similar anion, although crystal structures show that there is generally a long weak bond with partial covalent character between the iodine and the counteranion. This interaction is particular strong for the case of coordinating anions like the halides but exists even for noncoordinating counterions such as perchlorate, triflate, or tetrafluoroborate. As a result, some authors regard them as λ3-iodanes, although others have more recently described such secondary bonding interactions as examples of halogen bonding. They are generally T-shaped, with the counteranion occupying an apical position. Diaryliodonium salts are not very soluble in many organic solvents when the counterion is a halide, possibly because halides are frequently found as bridging dimers. Solubility is improved with triflate and tetrafluoroborate counterions.

Diaryliodonium salts can be prepared in a number of ways. In one method an aryl iodide is first oxidized to an aryliodine(III) compound (such as ArIO) followed by a ligand exchange with an arene in the presence of a Brønsted or Lewis acid (an electrophilic aromatic substitution reaction) or using an organometallic reagent such as an arylstannane or an arylsilane. In another method, diaryliodonium salts are prepared from preformed hypervalent iodine compounds such as iodic acid, iodosyl sulfate or iodosyl triflate. The first such compound was synthesised in 1894 by coupling of two oxidized aryl iodides catalyzed by silver hydroxide (the Meyer and Hartmann reaction).

Diaryliodonium salts react with nucleophiles at iodine replacing one ligand and then form the substituted arene ArNu and iodobenzene ArI by reductive elimination or by substitution by ligand. diaryliodonium salts also react with metals M through ArMX intermediates in cross-coupling reactions.

Uses
The predominant use of hypervalent iodine compounds is that of oxidizing reagent replacing many toxic reagents based on heavy metals. Thus, a hypervalent iodine (III) reagent was used, as oxidant, together with ammonium acetate, as the nitrogen source, to provide 2-Furonitrile, a pharmaceutical intermediate and potential artificial sweetener, in aqueous acetonitrile at 80 °C in 90% yield.

Current research focuses on their use in carbon-carbon and carbon-heteroatom bond forming reactions. In one study such reaction, an intramolecular C-N coupling of an alkoxyhydroxylamine to its anisole group is accomplished with a catalytic amount of aryliodide in trifluoroethanol:

In this reaction the iodane (depicted as intermediate A) is formed by oxidation of the aryliodide with the sacrificial catalyst mCPBA which in turn converts the hydroxylamine group to a nitrenium ion B. This ion is the electrophile in ipso addition to the aromatic ring forming a lactam with an enone group.

See also
 Carbonyl oxidation with hypervalent iodine reagents

References

External links 
Hypervalent Iodine Chemistry

 
Oxidizing agents